The putting-out system is a means of subcontracting work. Historically, it was also known as the workshop system and the domestic system. In putting-out, work is contracted by a central agent to subcontractors who complete the project via remote work. It was used in the English and American textile industries, in shoemaking, lock-making trades, and making parts for small firearms from the Industrial Revolution until the mid-19th century. After the invention of the sewing machine in 1846, the system lingered on for the making of ready-made men's clothing.

The domestic system was suited to pre-urban times because workers did not have to travel from home to work, which was quite unfeasible due to the state of roads and footpaths, and members of the household spent many hours in farm or household tasks. Early factory owners sometimes had to build dormitories to house workers, especially girls and women. Putting-out workers had some flexibility to balance farm and household chores with the putting-out work, this being especially important in winter.

The development of this trend is often considered to be a form of proto-industrialization, and remained prominent until the Industrial Revolution of the 19th century.

At that point, it underwent name and geographical changes. However, bar some technological advancements, the putting-out system has not changed in essential practice. Contemporary examples can be found in China, India, and South America, and are not limited to the textiles industry.

Firearms
Historian David A. Hounshell writes: 

All of the processes were carried out under different cottage roofs. It was replaced by inside contracting and the factory system.

European cloth and other trades
The domestic system was a popular system of cloth production in Europe. It was also used in various other industries, including the manufacture of wrought iron ironware such as pins, pots, and pans for ironmongers.

It existed as early as the 15th century, but was most prominent in the 17th and 18th centuries. It served as a way for capitalists and workers to bypass the guild system, which was thought to be cumbersome and inflexible, and to access a rural labour force. Having the workers work in their homes was convenient for both parties. Workers were remote workers, manufacturing individual articles from raw materials, then bring them to a central place of business, such as a marketplace or a larger town, to be assembled and sold. In other cases travelling agents or traders would tour the villages, supplying the raw materials and collecting the finished goods. The raw materials were often provided by the merchant, who received the finished product, hence the synonymous term putting-out system. The advantages of this system were that workers involved could work at their own speed , and children working in the system were better treated than they would have been in the factory system, although the homes might be polluted by the toxins from the raw materials. As the woman of a family usually worked at home, someone was often there to look after any children. The domestic system is often cited as one of the causes of the rise of the nuclear family in Europe, as the large amount of profits gained by common people made them less dependent on their extended family. These considerable sums of money also led to a much wealthier peasantry with more furniture, higher-quality food, and better clothing than they had had before. It was mostly centralized in Western Europe and did not take a strong hold in Eastern Europe.

Thomas Hood's poem The Song of the Shirt (1843) describes the wretched life of a woman in Lambeth labouring under such a system. It was written in honour of a woman who is known only as Mrs. Biddell, a Lambeth widow and seamstress who lived in a state of poverty. In what was, at that time, common practice, she sewed trousers and shirts in her home using materials given to her by her employer, for which she was forced to give a £2 deposit. In a desperate attempt to feed her starving infants, Mrs. Biddell pawned the clothing she had made, thus accruing a debt that she could not pay.  Biddell was sent to a workhouse, and her ultimate fate is unknown; however, her story became a catalyst for those who actively opposed the wretched conditions of England’s working poor, who often spent seven days a week labouring under inhuman conditions, barely managing to survive and with no prospect for relief.

Anders Jonsson (1816–1890) was a famous Swedish entrepreneur who continued a putting-out business at Holsljunga. He contracted up to 200 domestic workers, who came to his house to get the raw material and returned after a couple of weeks with textiles, that local pedlars from the city of Borås then bought and went out to sell, among other things, around Sweden and Norway.

Cottage industry

A cottage industry is an industry—primarily manufacturing—which includes many producers, working from their homes, and was often organized through the putting-out system. The biggest contributors in this system were the merchant capitalist and the rural worker. The merchant would "put-out" basic materials to the cottage workers, who then prepared the materials in their own homes and returned the finished merchandise back to the merchant. The term originally referred to home workers who were engaged in a task such as sewing, lace-making, wall hangings, or household manufacturing. Some industries which are usually operated from large, centralized factories were cottage industries before the Industrial Revolution. Business operators would travel around the world, buying raw materials, delivering them to people who would work on them, and then collecting the finished goods to sell, or typically to ship to another market. One of the factors which allowed the Industrial Revolution to take place in Western Europe was the presence of these business people who had the ability to expand the scale of their operations. Cottage industries were very common in the time when a large proportion of the population was engaged in agriculture, because the farmers (and their families) often had both the time and the desire to earn additional income during the part of the year (winter) when there was little work to do farming or selling produce by the farm's roadside.

See also
 Dorset button
 Factory system
 Inside contracting
 Piece-rate list
 Ton'ya (問屋) trade brokers of ancient Japan
 Freelancers and Independent Contractors

References

Bibliography

Early Modern economics
Labour economics